Combat 84 were an English punk rock band active during the early 1980s. Formed in 1981 in Chelsea, London by skinheads 'Chubby' Chris Henderson and 'Deptford' John Armitage, Combat 84 rose to national prominence after being featured in a controversial 1982 BBC Arena documentary about the skinhead movement.

Career
The band was originally composed of Chris Henderson (vocals), 'Deptford' John Armitage (bass guitar), Jim (guitar) and Brownie (drums) and played their first gig supporting The Last Resort at the Walmer Castle, Peckham. The Last Resort's lead singer, Roi Pearce (later of The 4-Skins) liked the band and agreed to produce a two-song demo tape with them. These sessions resulted in the songs "Soldier" and "Combat 84", which were favourably received in the music press, leading to the band being described as 'the new Sham 69'.

In 1982, the manager of The 4-Skins, Gary Hitchcock attempted to get the band signed to Secret Records, then home to The 4-Skins, The Business, Infa Riot and The Exploited, although the deal fell through at the last minute, prompting Combat 84 to sign to Victory Records for the release of their Orders of the Day EP. Former Business drummer John Fisher replaced Brownie for the recording of the second (1983) EP, Rapist.

More right-leaning, lyrically than many of their punk rock and Oi! peers, Combat 84 received much criticism for recording a song that advocated capital punishment for rapists ("Rapist"), and a song that supported nuclear weapons and criticised the Campaign for Nuclear Disarmament (CND) and reds ("Right to Choose"). Guitarist Jim stated in a 2000 interview that the latter song was intended in a tongue-in-cheek manner, and as a homage to Vietnam War movies. The song Politically Incorrect attacked several targets, including beggars, foreign aid, the Guardian, lesbians and women's liberation. Other lyrical themes included unemployment, inner-city violence, war, and slavish followers of fashion.

Controversy erupted around the band after they were featured in a 1982 BBC Arena documentary, during which Henderson alleged that the police were tougher on White skinheads than they were on Black rioters, said that "there will never be racial harmony" and blamed the Asians for the 1981 Southall riot, during which the band were attacked inside a gig venue. Deptford John briefly made some comments in agreement with Henderson over the riots but, in a later part of the documentary, he said that skinheads should be able to empathise with Blacks when they are denied jobs or entrance to venues, and should remember that, whereas skinheads can change how they look, Blacks cannot change their skin colour. Footage of crowd violence at a gig in Harlow was broadcast at the end of the documentary. This led to the break-up of the band, as their newly earned bad reputation discouraged venues from booking the band. Gigs were then often played under the pseudonym The 7th Cavalry to avoid the stigma of the Combat 84 name.

Victory Records, wanting little to do with the band at this point, compiled an album of studio recordings (intended for the band's debut album) and bootleg-quality live tracks and licensed it to German label Rock-O-Rama Records for release as Send in the Marines in 1984. The record was disowned by the band, which split up soon after.

In the intervening years, Combat 84 were frequently labelled as a neo-Nazi, white power or Rock Against Communism (RAC) band, a charge which has been denied by 'Deptford' John and Jim, noting that the band's songs contained no racist lyrics, nor were they ever aligned with any far-right political party. The band's reputation was made worse by the similarity in name to a neo-Nazi group called Combat 18. 'Deptford' John was able to retain a career by joining The Exploited, whose lyrics on certain issues were different to Combat 84 (e.g. The Exploited were against nuclear weapons), but John noted in a 2001 interview with the "Pissed and Proud" fanzine that he believes in free speech and whilst not supporting it, that RAC music should be allowed a platform as "people should be allowed to say what they want". In his book, Chris Henderson said that the 84 in the name was a reference to George Orwell's book 1984 and that the band adhered to the philosophy of George Orwell.

Aftermath and reunion
'Deptford' John and Jim went on to roadie for and play with the UK Subs and The Exploited, and John Fisher played with former members of The Last Resort in The Warriors. After retiring from the music business, Chris Henderson became more involved with football hooliganism, and eventually led the Chelsea Headhunters (a group which itself, ironically, has links to organizations such as Combat 18) in the mid-to-late 1980s, writing the book Who Wants it? (with Colin Ward) about his experiences. He owned a bar in Pattay, Thailand and died on 31 October 2013. In 2000, the band reformed without Henderson for the release of the Tooled Up EP, released on their own 7th Cavalry record label. 'Deptford' John took over vocal duties, with Jim on guitar, and F.T. and Suds on bass and drums respectively.

Discography

Albums
Send in the Marines (1984)
 Death Or Glory (1987, with The Last Resort)
Charge of the 7th Cavalry (1989) (posthumous live album, released on Step-1 Records)
Orders of the Day (2000) (posthumous collection containing all studio recordings, released on Step-1 Records)

EPs
Orders of the Day (1982)
Rapist (1983)
Tooled Up (2000)

References

English punk rock groups
Musical groups from London
Oi! groups
Musical groups established in 1981
Musical groups disestablished in 1984
Musical groups reestablished in 2000
Musical quartets